Ivana Vokurková (born January 4, 1971) is a Czechoslovak sprint canoer who competed in the early 1990s. She was eliminated in the semifinals of the K-4 500 m event at the 1992 Summer Olympics in Barcelona.

References
 Sports-Reference.com profile

1971 births
Canoeists at the 1992 Summer Olympics
Czechoslovak female canoeists
Czech female canoeists
Living people
Olympic canoeists of Czechoslovakia